This table is determined by when the March Equinox falls. It fell on March 20 from 2018 to 2021 and will fall on March 21 in 2022–2023. All Baha'i observances begin at the sundown prior to the date listed, and end at sundown of the date in question unless otherwise noted.
The Birth of the Báb and Birth of Baháʼu'lláh fall on November 5–6 in 2021.

See also
List of observances set by the Solar Hijri calendar

External links
https://www.badi-calendar.com/calculator.php

References

Bahá'í